The 2004 AFC Asian Cup Final was a football match that took place on 7 August 2004 at the Workers' Stadium in Beijing, the People's Republic of China, to determine the winners of the 2004 AFC Asian Cup.

Background
The 2004 AFC Asian Cup was the 13th AFC Asian Cup, a football competition organised by the AFC for senior men's national teams of member associations. Qualifying began from 21 March to 3 December 2003, divided into two rounds: preliminary and qualifying, with seven groups in each stage. The top two teams of each seven groups in the final qualifying round would progress to the tournament.

China and Japan automatically qualified for the tournament, with China being the hosts and Japan being the defending champions, having beaten Saudi Arabia in the previous final. Also in the previous edition in Lebanon, China and Japan faced each other in the semi-finals, with Japan winning 3–2. Leading up to this match, China had won against Japan 15 times while Japan had only beaten China in 10 matches; yet China hadn't won the AFC Asian Cup, only finishing second in 1984, while Japan claimed their first Asian Cup title at home in 1992 before winning it again in 2000.

Route to the final

China
As hosts, China were automatically assigned in Group A, facing Indonesia, Bahrain and Qatar in process. All three China's group stage games were held in Beijing. China went to suffer a shock 2–2 draw over minnows Bahrain in the opening fixture, with Husain Ali burying China's hope for a maiden win with a last-minute goal. China then routed Indonesia 5–0, with Shao Jiayi scoring twice in China's emphatic win, added with Indonesia only playing with ten men due to a red card by Alexander Pulalo after Shao's opening goal. However, China struggled against a highly defensive Qatar in the final game, only winning 1–0 courtesy of a 77th-minute goal from Xu Yunlong to top the group and reaching the quarter-finals.

China's first opponent in the knockout stage was Iraq, who finished second in Group B. Hao Haidong scored an early lead before Zheng Zhi netted two penalties to give China a triumphant 3–0 win over the Iraqis. In the semi-finals, China faced Iran, a far stronger side. The Chinese scored first in the 18th minute thanks to Shao Jiayi, only to be equalised 20 minutes later by Mohammad Alavi. Iran was later reduced to ten men when Sattar Zare was sent off for shoving Shao Jiayi, before another red card was given in the second half on Alavi, who was already substituted early in the second half. Yet China failed to capitalise the opportunity and had to settle on a penalty shootout, which they won 4–3, with Yahya Golmohammadi missing Iran's crucial kick.

Japan
As the defending champions, Japan were drawn in Group D with debutants Oman, alongside fellow powerhouse Iran and Thailand. All of Japan's group stage matches were played in Chongqing, which became a hotspot for anti-Japanese hostilities. Japan began their campaign with a hard-fought 1–0 win over Oman, with Shunsuke Nakamura scoring the match's only goal. Japan then overcame a shock goal to defeat Thailand 4–1, effectively knocking the War Elephants out of the tournament. Japan then confirmed their top place in the group with a goalless draw over Iran.

In the quarter-finals, Japan faced Jordan, another dark horse of the tournament. To make things difficult, Mahmoud Shelbaieh opened the score for Jordan in the 11th minute, before Takayuki Suzuki equalised just three minutes later. Japan failed to make subsequent chances in the second half and extra time and had to settle for penalties, after Shunsuke Nakamura and Alex missed two of Japan's three first penalties while the Jordanians succeeded in converting both, yet they went on to miss four straight kicks due to controversial decisions, allowing Japan time to restore parity before winning 4–3. Japan's semi-final match in Jinan was a showdown against Bahrain, another Arab opponent. Despite Yasuhito Endo's red card in the 40th minute, the Samurai Blue came out victorious, winning 4–3 after extra time.

Match

Details

Aftermath
Political tensions related to World War II, which later transcended into the field, would be further escalated by the defeat of the Chinese hosts to Japan, which the second goal of Japan by Koji Nakata, a handball goal, was counted by the Kuwaiti referee despite complains by the Chinese players. In response, Chinese fans started rioting outside the stadium and attacked the buses escorting Japanese team and fans. This in turn affected China's perpetration for the 2008 Summer Olympics in Beijing.

For the Chinese team as well, this loss meant they had failed to lift the trophy twice, with its first hurdle happened in the 1984 when it lost to Saudi Arabia. This traumatic loss and the incorrect decision by the referee would play a role in causing the demise of China's football fortune, as the Chinese had not returned to the final of an Asian Cup since.

For Japan, this was the first time Japan had defended the trophy. This triumphant experience was even remarkable, given it was done in a very hostile environment caused by Chinese supporters in relations to Japanese war crimes in World War II. Japan would go on to lift the trophy again in 2011, before losing its first final in 2019.

See also
 China–Japan football rivalry

References

External links

2004
2004 AFC Asian Cup
AFC Asian Cup Final
1
2004
2004
Asia
China–Japan relations
August 2004 sports events in Asia
Politics and sports